The 2006–07 Orlando Magic season was the team's 18th in the NBA. They began the season hoping to improve upon their 36–46 output from the previous season. They best it by four wins, finishing 40–42, qualifying for the playoffs. A four-game sweep to the Detroit Pistons in the opening round eliminated the Magic from the playoffs. Following the season, Grant Hill signed as a free agent with the Phoenix Suns  and Brian Hill was fired again.

Draft picks

Roster

Regular season

Season standings

Record vs. opponents

Game log

Playoffs

|- align="center" bgcolor="#ffcccc"
| 1
| April 21
| @ Detroit
| L 92–100
| Hedo Türkoğlu (17)
| Dwight Howard (10)
| Grant Hill (5)
| The Palace of Auburn Hills22,076
| 0–1
|- align="center" bgcolor="#ffcccc"
| 2
| April 23
| @ Detroit
| L 90–98
| Hedo Türkoğlu (22)
| Dwight Howard (11)
| Hill, Arroyo (4)
| The Palace of Auburn Hills22,076
| 0–2
|- align="center" bgcolor="#ffcccc"
| 3
| April 26
| Detroit
| L 77–93
| Jameer Nelson (27)
| Dwight Howard (12)
| Nelson, Türkoğlu (4)
| Amway Arena17,451
| 0–3
|- align="center" bgcolor="#ffcccc"
| 4
| April 28
| Detroit
| L 93–97
| Dwight Howard (29)
| Dwight Howard (17)
| Hedo Türkoğlu (5)
| Amway Arena17,451
| 0–4
|-

Player statistics

Regular season 

|-
| 
| 57 || 7 || 22.4 || .539 || .000 || .620 || 4.4 || 1.1 || style=";"| 1.0 || .3 || 8.9
|-
| 
| 72 || 5 || 18.1 || .425 || .275 || .795 || 1.9 || 2.8 || .5 || .0 || 7.7
|-
| 
| 2 || 0 || 3.5 || .333 || . || . || 1.5 || 1.0 || .0 || .0 || 1.0
|-
| 
| 66 || 66 || 23.9 || .489 || .000 || .675 || 5.2 || .5 || .4 || .5 || 6.1
|-
| 
| 59 || 18 || 16.8 || .404 || .387 || .746 || 1.6 || 1.0 || .5 || .0 || 5.1
|-
| 
| 26 || 0 || 11.1 || .425 || .360 || .800 || .7 || 1.3 || .2 || .0 || 3.8
|-
| 
| 66 || 2 || 21.7 || .410 || .323 || .809 || 1.3 || 1.7 || .8 || .2 || 7.9
|-
| 
| 33 || 0 || 8.4 || .314 || .344 || .889 || 1.3 || .4 || .2 || .0 || 2.2
|-
| 
| 65 || 64 || 30.9 || .518 || .167 || .765 || 3.6 || 2.1 || .9 || .4 || 14.4
|-
| 
| style=";"| 82 || style=";"| 82 || style=";"| 36.9 || .603 || .500 || .586 || style=";"| 12.3 || 1.9 || .9 || style=";"| 1.9 || style=";"| 17.6
|-
| 
| 80 || 16 || 23.9 || .454 || .000 || .613 || 5.5 || 1.1 || .6 || 1.8 || 8.0
|-
| 
| 77 || 77 || 30.3 || .430 || .335 || .828 || 3.1 || style=";"| 4.3 || .9 || .1 || 13.0
|-
| 
| 41 || 0 || 11.2 || style=";"| .667 || . || .591 || 2.6 || .4 || .4 || .1 || 2.0
|-
| 
| 42 || 0 || 14.8 || .410 || style=";"| .388 || style=";"| .900 || 1.2 || .9 || .3 || .0 || 6.0
|-
| 
| 73 || 73 || 31.1 || .419 || style=";"| .388 || .781 || 4.0 || 3.2 || style=";"| 1.0 || .2 || 13.3
|}

Playoffs

|-
| 
| style=";"| 4 || 0 || 11.8 || .313 || . || .250 || 2.3 || 1.3 || .3 || .0 || 2.8
|-
| 
| 3 || 0 || 13.3 || .357 || .000 || style=";"| 1.000 || 1.7 || 2.0 || .3 || .0 || 4.0
|-
| 
| style=";"| 4 || style=";"| 4 || 21.8 || .389 || . || .250 || 4.0 || .3 || .0 || .0 || 3.8
|-
| 
| style=";"| 4 || 0 || 16.3 || .480 || .333 || .667 || 1.8 || 1.3 || .5 || .3 || 7.3
|-
| 
| style=";"| 4 || style=";"| 4 || 35.8 || .500 || . || .667 || 5.5 || style=";"| 3.8 || .5 || .3 || 15.0
|-
| 
| style=";"| 4 || style=";"| 4 || style=";"| 41.8 || .548 || . || .455 || style=";"| 14.8 || 1.8 || .5 || style=";"| 1.0 || style=";"| 15.3
|-
| 
| style=";"| 4 || 0 || 28.8 || style=";"| .588 || . || .529 || 4.5 || 1.0 || .3 || style=";"| 1.0 || 12.3
|-
| 
| style=";"| 4 || style=";"| 4 || 32.3 || .420 || .357 || .909 || 3.0 || 3.3 || .8 || .0 || 14.3
|-
| 
| 1 || 0 || 11.0 || .500 || style=";"| 1.000 || .750 || .0 || 2.0 || .0 || .0 || 3.0
|-
| 
| style=";"| 4 || style=";"| 4 || 39.0 || .500 || .333 || .500 || 3.3 || 3.5 || style=";"| 1.3 || style=";"| 1.0 || 13.8
|}

Awards and records
Dwight Howard – All-NBA 3rd Team, All-Star

Transactions

References

Orlando Magic seasons
2006 in sports in Florida
2007 in sports in Florida